Shammi Rana is a promoter of Traditional Sports and Games (TSG) from India. He was appointed Secretary-General of the International Council of Traditional Sports and Games (ICTSG) at 4th  UNESCO Collective Consultation of Traditional Sports and Games. Shammi Rana was also appointed Rapporteur of Traditional Sports and Games by UNESCO in the 3rd Collective Consultation on the Safeguarding and Promotion of Traditional Sports and Games.

Career
Shammi Rana held several positions at various sports organizations worldwide. In 2020, he was honored with a Presidential Award in the USA. Shammi Rana was elected as Secretary-General of Asian Jujitsu and Belt Wrestling Federation in 2009 and attended the 1st Indoor Asian Martial Arts Games as Referee for Ju-jitsu. In 2016, he attended World Martial Arts Masterships as Technical Director for Belt Wrestling.

Promotional work

Shammi has made a lot of effort to promote Traditional Sports Games in UNESCO. He has met with many officials from different countries to promote TSG. He participated in the Canadian parliament and was assured their support for TSG. He visited South Korea with Khalil Ahmed, chairman of the Advisory Committee of TSG UNESCO, and held a meeting with Korean authority for support and sponsorship of Traditional Sports and Games.

In Africa, he met Sierra Leone deputy sports minister Kai Lawrence Mbayo. Shammi explained the importance of Traditional Sports and the deputy minister assured his full support.

He met with Erin Bromaghim, Director of Olympic and Paralympic Development in Los Angeles. Shammi proposed that Traditional Sports and Games should be included in Olympics 2028, which will be held in Los Angeles. Because of his efforts, the first Worldwide Traditional Sports and Games will be held in Astana, Kazakhstan.

He, along with Hari Banaag, member of the advisory committee of TSG UNESCO, met with  Congressman Terrance John Cox and emphasized founding a Pan-America Traditional Sports and Games Headquarter in Delano, California.

Awards and honors 
 2021 - USA President's Lifetime Achievement Award
 2020 - USA President's Lifetime Achievement Award
 2019 - Honorary Doctorate Degree in Martial Arts Philosophy and Martial Arts Science by the University of Asian Martial Arts Studies (2019)
 USA Martial Arts Hall of Fame Award
 Shammi Rana elected as President of Rising Sun Welfare Society(Regd)

References 

Living people
1978 births
Indian sports executives and administrators
Sportspeople from Amritsar
Sportspeople from Amritsar district
Sportspeople from Punjab, India
Punjabi Hindus
People from Punjab, India
Punjabi people
People from Amritsar district
People from Amritsar